Halian is a sub-district located in Mudhaykhirah District, Ibb Governorate, Yemen. Halianhad a population of 6,094 according to the 2004 census.

References 

Sub-districts in Mudhaykhirah District